The A469 is a road in south Wales.  It links Cardiff and Caerphilly with Rhymney and the Heads of the Valleys Road (A465).

See also 
 Transport in Cardiff
 Transport in Wales

References
 Cardiff & Newport A-Z Street Atlas 2007 Edition

Roads in Wales
Transport in Cardiff
Transport in Caerphilly County Borough